IMAP may refer to:

Internet Message Access Protocol, an Internet standard protocol used by email clients
Interstellar Mapping and Acceleration Probe, a NASA spacecraft mission to study the boundary of the heliosphere